For woven textiles, grain refers to the orientation of the weft and warp threads. The three named grains are straight grain, cross grain, and the bias grain. In sewing, a pattern piece can be cut from fabric in any orientation, and the chosen grain or orientation will affect the way the fabric hangs and stretches and thus the fit of a garment. Generally speaking a piece is said to be cut on a particular grain when the longest part of the pattern or the main seams of the finished piece are aligned with that grain. Non-woven materials such as felt, interfacing or leather do not have a grain.

Straight grain
The straight grain is oriented parallel with the warp threads and the selvedge. The straight grain typically has less stretch than the crossgrain since the warp threads will be pulled tighter than the weft during weaving. Most garments are cut with the straight grain oriented top to bottom.

Cross grain
The cross grain runs perpendicular to the selvedge and parallel to the weft threads. The cross grain generally has more stretch than the straight grain since the weft threads are generally looser than the warp during weaving. Most garments (like pants or shirts) are cut on the straight grain with the cross grain parallel with the floor when the wearer is standing. This allows more stretch through the width of the garment, such as in a pants leg which needs more circumferential than vertical stretch. Garments are sometimes cut on the cross grain, generally because the pieces are too wide to fit on the straight grain.

Bias

The bias grain of a piece of woven fabric, usually referred to simply as "the bias", is any grain that falls between the straight and cross grains. When the grain is at 45 degrees to its warp and weft threads it is referred to as "true bias."  Every piece of woven fabric has two biases, perpendicular to each other. A garment made of woven fabric is said to be "cut on the bias" when the fabric's warp and weft threads are on one of the bias grains.

Woven fabric is more elastic as well as more fluid in the bias direction, compared to the straight and cross grains.  This property facilitates garments and garment details that require extra elasticity, drapability or flexibility, such as bias-cut skirts and dresses, neckties, piping trims and decorations, bound seams, etc.

The "bias-cut" is a technique used by designers for cutting clothing to utilize the greater stretch in the bias or diagonal direction of the fabric, thereby causing it to accentuate body lines and curves and drape softly. For example, a full-skirted dress cut on the bias will hang more gracefully or a narrow dress will cling to the figure. Bias-cut garments were an important feature of the designs of Madeleine Vionnet in 1920s and 1930s and bias-cut styles are revived periodically. The old spelling was byas, or (less common) byess.

See also 
 Bias tape

References 

Textiles
Sewing